Sunrise is a side-platformed Sacramento RT light rail station in Rancho Cordova, California, United States. The station was opened on June 11, 2004, and is operated by the Sacramento Regional Transit District. It is served by the Gold Line. The station is located on Folsom Boulevard just south of Highway 50 at the intersection of Sunrise Boulevard.

Sunrise, along with Zinfandel and Cordova Town Center, opened on June 11, 2004, as part of an $89 million,  extension of what was then the original Watt/I-80–Downtown–Mathers Field/Mills line east of the Mather Field/Mills station. Sunrise served as the eastern terminus for what was then the newly created Downtown–Sunrise line (now Gold Line) until the extension to Historic Folsom opened on October 15, 2005. Rancho Cordova city officials have stated the establishment of the stations will help in the development of transit-oriented development/redevelopment of the Folsom corridor through the city.

Sunrise serves as a major station on the eastern section of the Gold Line. Light rail operates from this stop to downtown at 15-minute intervals during peak time periods, while trains leave Folsom at 30-minute headways during this portion of the day. Many trains end their routes at this facility, as service between Folsom and Sunrise ceases at 7:30 p.m. every evening. Additionally, connection to RT Bus Route 74 can be made, and there is a 487-space park and ride lot located at the station.

Farmer's Market
In March 2010 a market was moved from its location in the parking lot of Sunrise Mall in Citrus Heights to the park and ride of the station every Saturday.

Platforms and tracks

External links
Station profile

References

Sacramento Regional Transit light rail stations
Rancho Cordova, California
Railway stations in the United States opened in 2004
2004 establishments in California